Burlingame High School is a public high school in Burlingame, California. It is part of the San Mateo Union High School District (SMUHSD).

History

In order to meet the growing student population, the school was opened in December 1923 under the name "San Mateo High School, Burlingame Branch."  Designed by architect W. H. Weeks, the school took in students from Burlingame, Hillsborough, Millbrae, and San Bruno. Initial enrollment consisted of 350 students and 30 teachers.  As a branch of San Mateo High School, extracurricular organizations were shared between the schools.  There was a single band, football team, and other athletic teams with student members from both schools.  Within 10 years the enrollment of the school increased to 494 boys and 474 girls, totaling 968 pupils, a figure close to the school's original design capacity. In 1927 the school name was officially changed to Burlingame High School.

In the summer of 1980, the SMUHSD board decided it must close one of the district's seven schools, due to declining enrollment.  Following public hearings, the board narrowed the choice to either Crestmoor High School or Burlingame High School.  After study and discussion, the board decided to close Crestmoor in the fall of 1980 and keep Burlingame open.

San Mateo and Burlingame have been rivals since the division of the Burlingame branch, and the rivalry culminates annually in a football matchup dubbed the "Little Big Game" and patterned after the collegiate Big Game. As of November 2021, Burlingame leads the series record 58–32–4. Burlingame currently holds "The Paw" as part of a twelve-game win streak, the longest in the rivalry's history.

Academics
Burlingame High School has been recognized nationally for its academic excellence.  For 2013, it was ranked 280th in Newsweeks Top 2,000 Public High Schools, 471st nationally by U.S. News & World Report, and 490th by The Washington Posts ranking of "America's Most Challenging High Schools."

As of the 2018–19 school year, the San Mateo Union High School District uses Canvas as its online platform for classrooms.

Burlingame High School has a wide array of Advanced Placement course offerings.

Statistics
Demographics2017–2018'''
 1,475 students: 776 male (52.6%), 699 female (47.4%) 

Approximately 11.9% of the students at Burlingame are served by the free or reduced-price lunch program.

Standardized testing

Extracurricular activities

Robotics
The Iron Panthers (FIRST Robotics Competition Team 5026 and FIRST Tech Challenge Team 7316) was founded in 2013 to compete against other Bay Area high schools. In September 2017, the Iron Panthers received recognition by competing in the finals of an off-season Robotics competition, Chezy Champs. In March 2018, the Iron Panthers' FTC team traveled to Spokane to compete in the West Super-Regional. In 2019, they were alliance captains at the Central Valley Regional, where they competed in the finals. In the past three years, the Iron Panthers traveled to Houston to compete in the FIRST Championship and were alliance captains in the 2018 game FIRST Power Up. In the 2019 game Destination: Deep Space, they were the winners of the Newton Division and the World Champions; this was the first competition that they won. Their motto is "Student-Built, Student-Run."

Burlingame Robotics also has an FTC team known as the Iron Kittens (Team 20392, formerly 10336).

Notable alumni and faculty

Dianna Agron, 2004 — actress in Glee; Agron was Homecoming queen
Bill Amend, 1980 — cartoonist best known for FoxTrotEric Bakhtiari, 2003 — former NFL player
Marc Benioff, 1982 — founder and co-CEO of Salesforce.com
Grant Brisbee, 1994 — baseball writer
Jim Burke — English teacher and author of books on teaching
Mary Crosby — actress, DallasNathaniel Crosby — golfer
Ben Eastman – Olympic athlete, 1932 Summer Olympics; one of three Americans to hold world record in both the 400 and 800 meters; voted into Track and Field Hall of Fame in 2006
Scott Feldman, 2001 — former Major League Baseball pitcher
Frankie Ferrari, 2014 — professional basketball player for Herbalife Gran Canaria of the Spanish Liga ACB and EuroCup Basketball
Matthew Fondy, 2007 — professional soccer forward
Val Garay - Grammy Award-winning record producer and audio engineer 
Zac Grotz, 2011 — MLB pitcher, currently in the Boston Red Sox organization.
Hannah Hart, 2004 — internet personality, best known for YouTube series My Drunk KitchenLou Harrison, 1934 — music composer, student of Arnold Schoenberg
Howie Hawkins — political activist
Shirley Jackson — writer
Adam Klein, 2009 — winner of Survivor: Millennials vs. Gen XAnthony Neely, 2004 — Mandopop singer in Taiwan
Jonathan "Butch" Norton, 1976 – former drummer with the band "Eels", session musician
 Jeanne Phillips — advice columnist who writes the advice column Dear Abby
 Ed Roberts, 1959 — activist, leader in disability rights movement
Brad Schreiber — writer
D. J. Sharabi - Olympic baseball player
Matt Sosnick — baseball agent featured in License to DealErik van Dillen —  U.S. Davis Cup tennis player, 1971–75
Mark Walen, 1980 — former NFL player

Popular culture
Scenes from the film Dangerous Minds'' were filmed on the campus of Burlingame High School in the spring of 1994.

See also

San Mateo County high schools

References

External links

Educational institutions established in 1923
Burlingame, California
High schools in San Mateo County, California
Public high schools in California
1923 establishments in California
W. H. Weeks buildings